Daniel Thomas Cosgrove (born December 16, 1970) is an American actor. He is known for his roles as Scott Chandler on All My Children, Matt Durning on Beverly Hills, 90210, Bill Lewis on Guiding Light, Christopher Hughes II on As the World Turns and Aiden Jennings on Days of Our Lives.

Cosgrove has been a cast member during the series finale of three consecutive cancelled soap operas: Guiding Light, As the World Turns, and All My Children.

Personal life

Daniel Cosgrove was born in New Haven, Connecticut and grew up in Branford, Connecticut.  He graduated from Notre Dame High School in 1989.

Cosgrove is married to Marie Cosgrove. The couple has four children.

Career

In 1996, Cosgrove joined the cast of the ABC soap opera All My Children in the role of Scott Chandler.  He left the show in the fall of 1998 to explore other opportunities. That same year, Cosgrove moved to Los Angeles to take the role of Matt Durning on Beverly Hills, 90210, where he remained until the show ended in 2000.

He played Richard "Dick" Bagg in the 2002 comedy film Van Wilder. In June 2002, he moved back to New York to join the cast of Guiding Light as Bill Lewis III, leaving the show in October 2005 after opting not to renew his contract.  He later returned to the role in October 2007 and was nominated for his first Daytime Emmy for Outstanding Supporting Actor in a Drama Series in 2008.  He remained on Guiding Light until the show left the air on Sept. 18, 2009.

Cosgrove moved back to California for his role as Jon Lemonick in the series, In Justice, which premiered on ABC in January 2006. In September 2007, he portrayed Freddy Mason on the ABC drama Dirty Sexy Money.

In March 2010, he began playing the role of Chris Hughes on As the World Turns until the show ended in September 2010.

Cosgrove returned to All My Children as Scott Chandler from December 2010 until the show's finale episode in September 2011. In January 2014, he joined the cast of Days of Our Lives as Aiden Jennings.

Cosgrove has been a cast member during the series finale of three consecutive cancelled soap operas: Guiding Light, As the World Turns, and All My Children.

In 2018, Cosgrove starred as Ron in the first season of the Lifetime thriller series You.

Filmography

References

External links

1970 births
American male film actors
American male soap opera actors
American male television actors
Living people
Male actors from Connecticut
20th-century American male actors
21st-century American male actors